The following is a list of Mongol rulers.

The list of states is chronological but follows the development of different dynasties.

Khamag Mongol (1120s–1206)

 Kaidu – the first Khan to unite the Mongol clans
 Khabul Khan – the first Khan of the Khamag Mongol confederation
 Ambaghai Khan
 Hotula Khan
 Yesugei (de facto)
 Genghis Khan

Mongol Empire (1206–1368)

Great Khans and Yuan dynasty

Before Kublai Khan announced the dynastic name "Great Yuan" in 1271, Khagans (Great Khans) of the Mongol Empire (Ikh Mongol Uls) already started to use the Chinese title of Emperor practically in the Chinese language since Genghis Khan (as ).

With the establishment of the Yuan dynasty in 1271, the Kublaids became Yuan emperors, who took on a dual identity of Khagan for the Mongols and Huangdi for ethnic Han.

Genghis Khan (1206–1227)
Tolui Khan (as Regent) (1227–1229)
Ögedei Khan (1229–1241)
Töregene Khatun (as Regent) (1241–1246) 
Güyük Khan (1246–1248)
Oghul Qaimish (as Regent) (1248–1251)
Möngke Khan (1251–1259)
Ariq Böke (1259–1264)
Kublai Khan (1260–1294) – Khagan title: Setsen; Temple name: Shizu (1271–1294) Era name: Zhongtong (中統) (1260–1264); Zhiyuan (至元) (1264–1294)
Temür Khan – Khagan title: Öljeitu; Temple name: Chengzong – (1294–1307); Era names: Yuanzhen (元貞) (1295–1297); Dade (大德) (1297–1307)
Külüg Khan – Khagan title: Khülük; Temple name: Wuzong – (1308–1311); Era name: Zhida (至大) (1308–1311)
Ayurbarwada Buyantu Khan – Temple name: Renzong – (1311–1320); Era names: Huangqing (皇慶) (1312–1313); Yanyou (延祐) (1314–1320)
Gegeen Khan – Khagan title: Gegeen; Temple name: Yingzong – (1321–1323); Era name: Zhizhi (至治) (1321–1323)
Yesün-Temür – Temple name: Taiding Di – (1323–1328); Era names: Taiding (泰定) (1321–1328); Zhihe (致和) 1328
Ragibagh Khan – Temple name: Tianshun Di; Era name: Tianshun (天順) (1328)
Jayaatu Khan Tugh Temür – Khagan title: Jayaaatu; Temple name: Wenzong – (1328–1329 / 1329–1332); Era names: Tianli (天歷) (1328–1330); Zhishun (至順) (1330–1332)
Khutughtu Khan Kusala – Khagan title: Khutughtu; Temple name: Mingzong; Era name: Tianli (天歷) (1329)
Rinchinbal Khan – Temple name: Ningzong; Era name: Zhishun (至順) (1332)
Toghon Temür – Khagan title: Ukhaantu; Temple name: Huizong ; Shundi – (1333–1370); Era names: Zhishun (至順) (1333); Yuantong (元統) (1333–1335); Zhiyuan (至元) (1335–1340); Zhizheng (至正) (1341–1368); Zhiyuan (至元) 1368–1370

Golden Horde

Batu Khan (1227–1255)
Sartaq (1255–56)
Ulaghchi (1257)
Berke (1257–1266)
Mengu-Timur (1266–1282)
Tuda Mengu (1282–1287)
Talabuga (1287–1291)
Toqta (1291–1312)
Uzbeg Khan (1312–1341)
Tini Beg (1341–1342)
Jani Beg (1342–1357)
Berdi Beg (1357–1361)
Qulpa (1359–1360)
Nawruz Beg (1360–1361)
Khidr (1361–1362)
Timur Khwaja (1362)
Abdallah (1362–1370), actual ruler was Mamai
Murad (1362–1367), actual ruler was Mamai
Aziz (1367–1369), actual ruler was Mamai
Jani Beg II (1369–1370), actual ruler was Mamai
Muhammad Bolak (1370–1379), actual ruler was Mamai
Tulun Beg Khanum (as regent) (1370–1373), actual ruler was Mamai
Aig Beg (1373–1376), actual ruler was Mamai
Arab Shaykh (1376–1379), actual ruler was Mamai
Kagan Beg (1375–1376), actual ruler was Mamai
Ilbani (1373–1376), actual ruler was Mamai
Hajji Cherkes (1375–1376), actual ruler was Mamai
Urus Khan (1376–1378), Urus was also Khan of the White Horde and uncle of Toqtamish, allowing the Hordes to unite.
Muhammad Bolaq (1375), actual ruler was Mamai
Ghiyath-ud-din Khaqan Beg (1375–1377)
Toqtaqiya (1377)
Arab Shah Muzaffar (1377–1380), actual ruler was Mamai
Timur-Malik (1377–1378)
Ghiyath-ud-din Khaqan Beg (1375–1377)
Tokhtamysh (1380–1395)
Temür Qutlugh (1396–1401), actual ruler was Edigu
Shadi Beg (1399–1407), actual ruler was Edigu
Pulad (1407–1410), actual ruler was Edigu
Temür (1410–1412)
Jalal ad-Din khan (1411–1412)
Feicüs al-Doste (1413–1414)
Karimberdi
Kebeg
Jabbar Berdi (1417–1419)
Olugh Mokhammad (1419–1421, 1428–1433)
Dawlat Berdi (1419–1421, 1427–1432)
Baraq (1422–1427)
Seyid Akhmed (1433–1435)
Küchük Muhammad (1435–1459)
Mahmud (1459–1465)
Ahmed (1465–1481)
Shayk Ahmad (1481–1498, 1499–1502)
Murtada (1498–1499)

Left wing (White Horde)

Orda (1226–1251)
Qun Quran (1251–c.1280)
Köchü (c.1280–1302)
Buyan (Bayan) (1302–1309)
Sasibuqa (1309–1315)
Ilbasan (1315–1320)
Mubarak Khwaja (1320–1344)
Chimtay (1344–1374)
Urus (1374–1376)
Toqtaqiya (1376)
Timur-Malik (1377)
Tokhtamysh (1377–1378)
Koiruchik (1378–1399)
Baraq (1423–1428)
Muhammed (1428–1431)
Mustafa (1431–1446)

This Horde was annexed by Abu'l-Khayr Khan of the Shaybanids in 1446.

Right wing (Blue Horde)

Actual rulers of the Golden Horde (Jochid Ulus, Kipchak Khanate) were members of the House of Batu until 1361.

Batu Khan (1227–1255)
Sartaq (1255–56)
Ulaghchi (1257)
Berke (1257–1266)
Mengu-Timur (1266–1282)
Tuda Mengu (1282–1287)
Talabuga (1287–1291)
Toqta (1291–1312)
Öz Beg Khan (1312–1341)
Tini Beg (1341–1342)
Jani Beg (1342–1357)
Berdi Beg (1357–1361)
Qulpa (1359–1360)
Nawruz Beg (1360–1361)
Khidr (1361–1362)
Timur Khwaja (1362)
Abdallah (1362–1370), actual ruler was Mamai

Great Horde (1466–1502)

Ilkhanate

Hülëgü (1256–1265)
Abaqa (1265–1282)
Tekuder (1282–1284)
Arghun (1284–1291)
Gaykhatu (1291–1295)
Baydu (1295)
Ghazan (1295–1304)
Öljaitü (1304–1316)
Abu Sa'id (1316–1335)
Arpa Ke'ün (1335–1336)

After the murder of Arpa, the regional states established during the disintegration of the Ilkhanate raised their own candidates as claimants.

Musa (1336–1337) (puppet of 'Ali Padshah of Baghdad)
Muhammad (1336–1338) (Jalayirid puppet)
Sati Beg (1338–1339) (Chobanid puppet)
Sulayman (1339–1343) (Chobanid puppet, recognized by the Sarbadars 1341–1343)
Jahan Temür (1339–1340) (Jalayirid puppet)
Anushirwan (1343–1356) (non-dynastic Chobanid puppet)
 Ghazan II (1356–1357) (known only from coinage)

Claimants from eastern Persia (Khurasan):

Togha Temür (c. 1338–1353) (recognized by the Kartids 1338–1349; by the Jalayirids 1338–1339, 1340–1344; by the Sarbadars 1338–1341, 1344, 1353)
 Luqman (1353–1388) (son of Togha Temür)

Chobanids (1335–1357)

Jalayirid Sultanate (1335–1432)

Injuids (1335–1357)

Arghun Dynasty (1479?–1599?)

Chagatai Khanate

Chagatai Khan 1226–1242
Qara Hülëgü 1242–1246 d. 1252
Yesü Möngke 1246–1252
Qara Hülëgü (restored) 1252
Mubarak Shah 1252–1260
Orghana Khatun (fem.), regent 1252–1260
Alghu 1260–1266
Mubarak Shah (restored) 1266
Baraq 1266–1270
Negübei 1270–c. 1272
Buqa Temür c. 1272–1287
Duwa 1287–1307
Könchek 1306–1308
Taliqu 1308–1309
Kebek 1309 d. 1325
Esen Buqa I 1309–c. 1318
Kebek (restored) c. 1318–1325
Eljigidey 1325–1329
Duwa Temür 1329–1330
Aladdin Tarmashirin 1331–1334
Buzan 1334–1335
Changshi 1335–1338
Yesun Temur c. 1338–c. 1342 with...
'Ali-Sultan 1342
Muhammad I ibn Pulad 1342–1343
Qazan Khan ibn Yasaur 1343–1346
Danishmendji 1346–1348

The Chagatai Khanate was split into two parts, western and eastern.

Moghulistan (Eastern Chagatai Khanate)

Bayan Qulï 1348–1358
Shah Temür 1358
Tughlugh Timur (in Mogulistan 1348–1363) 1358–1363
Ilyas Khodja (in Mogulistan 1363–1368) 1363 d. 1368
Adil-Sultan 1363
Khabul Shah 1364–1370

From 1370 on, the Chagatai Khans were puppets of Timur.

Suurgatmish 1370–1388
Sultan Mahmud (Mohammed II) 1388–1402

Kara Del (1383–1513)

Northern Yuan dynasty (1368–1634)

Khagans of the Mongols or Northern Yuan dynasty (rump state of Yuan dynasty until 1388):

Toghon Temür (1368–1370)
Biligtü Khan Ayushiridara (1370–1378)
Uskhal Khan Tögüs Temür (1378–1388)
Jorightu Khan Yesüder (1388–1391) – descendant of Ariq Böke
Engke Khan (1391–1394) – descendant of Ariq Böke
Elbeg Nigülesügchi Khan (1394–1399)
Gün Temür Khan (1399–1402) – descendant of Ariq Böke
Örüg Temür Khan (nickname Guilichi) (1402–1408) – descendant of Ögedei
Öljei Temür Khan (Bunyashiri) (1408–1412)
Delbeg Khan (Dalbag) (1412–1415) – descendant of Ariq Böke
Oyiradai (1415–1425) – descendant of Ariq Böke
Adai Khan (1425–1438) – descendant of Ögedei
Tayisung Khan Toghtoa Bukha (1433–1452)
Agbarjin (1453)
Esen taishi – the leader of the Oirats (1453–1454) – non-Chingisid
Markörgis Khan (Ükegtü) (1454–1465)
Molon Khan (1465–1466)
Manduul Khan (1475–1478)
Dayan Khan (Batu Möngke) (1478–1516)
Bars Bolud Jinong (deputy)
Bodi Alagh Khan (1516–1547)
Daraisung Guden Khan (1547–1557)
Tümen Jasagtu Khan (1557–1592)
Buyan Sechen Khan (1592–1604)
Ligdan Khan (1604–1634)
Ejei Khan (1634–1635)

Genghisid Khalkha Khans (1600s–1691)
Independent Khalkha Mongol Khans (before Outer Mongolia merged into Manchu Qing):

Tüsheet Khans 
Abtai Sain Khan (1567–1588) 
Eriyekhei Mergen Khan (1589–?) 
Gombodorji Khan (d. 1655) 
Chakhun Dorji Khan (1654–1698)

Jasagtu Khans 
Laikhur Khan 
Subandai Khan 
Norbu Bisireltü Khan (d. 1661)
Chambun Khan (1670?–)
Zenggün 
Shara (d. 1687)

Sechen Khans 
Sholoi (1627–1652), son of Morbuim, succeeded his brother Khar Zagal in 1627. First with the title of Setsen Khan.
Babu (1652–1683), fifth son of Sholoi.
Norov (1683–1688), third son of Babu.

Ancestry of Navaanneren /1910–1922/, eldest son of Tserendondov, who was the son of Orjinjav the son of Artased.

Altan Khan of the Khalkha 
 Ubasi Khong Tayiji (Shului Ubasha Khong Tayiji) (?-1623)
 Badma Erdeni Khong Tayiji (1623-?)
 Erinchin Lobsang Tayiji (or Lobdzang or Rinchen Sayin Khong Tayiji) (1658-91)

Oirats

Four Oirat (1399–1634)

Khuuhai Dayuu (c. 1399)
Ugetchi Khashikha (Mongolian: Ögöchi Khashikha; Mönkhtömör)
Batula Chinsan (Bahamu, Mahamud) (1399–1408)
Togoon Tayisi (Toghan) (1408–1438)
Esen (1438–1454)
Amasanj (1454–1455)
Ush-Temür (Ish-Temür) (1455–1469)
Khishig Urlugh
Arkhan Chingsang

Dzungar Khanate

Khara Khula (d. 1634)
Baatur Khung-Taiji (1634–1653)
Sengge (1653–1670)
Galdan Boshugtu Khan (1670–1697)
Tsewang Arabtan (1694–1727)
Galdan Tseren Khan (1727–1745)
Tsewang-Dorji-Namjil (1746–1749)
Lamdarja (1749–1752)
Dawachi (1752–1755)

Khans of Khoshut Khanate

Güshi Khan Toro-Baikhu (1642–1655)
Dayan Ochir Khan (1655–1669)
Gonchug Dalai Khan (1669–1698)
Lhazang Chingis Khan (1698–1717)

Khotgoid Khanate (late 16th century – late 17th century)

Torghud khans of the Kalmyk Khanate

Kho Orluk (d. 1644)
Shukhur Daichin (1644–1661)
Puntsuk (1661–1669)
Ayuka Khan (1669–1724)
Tseren Donduk Khan (1724–1735)
Donduk Ombo Khan (1735–1741)
Donduk Dashi Khan (1741–1761)
Ubashi Khan (1762–1771)

Bogd Khanate of Mongolia (1911–1924)

Bogd Khan (r. 1911–19, 1921–24) – Era name: Olnoo Örgögdsön (1911–1924); (the 8th Jebtsundamba Khutuktu) – Tibetan Spiritual head of Mongolian's Geluk Sect.

See also
Borjigin
Choros (Oirats)
History of Mongolia
Khoshut
List of heads of state of Mongolia
List of Mongol khatuns
List of Mongol states
Yuan dynasty family tree

References

Citations

Sources 

 Dughlát Muhammad Haidar, Norbert Elias, Edward Denison Ross – The Tarikh-i-rashidi
 Henry Hoyle Howorth-History of the Mongols
 Herbert Franke, Denis Twitchett, John King Fairbank -The Cambridge History of China: Alien regimes and border states, 907–1368
 William Bayne Fisher, Peter Jackson, Laurence Lockhart, J. A. Boyle -The Cambridge history of Iran, 5
 Konstantin Nikolaevich Maksimov – Kalmykia in Russia's past and present national policies and administrative system

 

History of the Mongol Empire
Lists of khans
Mongolia
Rulers